La America was a Judeo-Spanish (Ladino) language weekly newspaper, published 1910–1925 in New York City, as a national Sephardi Jewish newspaper in the United States. It was edited by Moise S. Gadol, an immigrant from Rostchuck, Bulgaria. Gadol's aim was to unite his readers for social and cultural purposes – "an uphill battle at best".

Marc D. Angel counts it as one of the two most important such publications historically, the other being La Vara.

Notes

1910 establishments in New York City
1925 disestablishments in New York (state)
Bulgarian-American history
Bulgarian-Jewish diaspora
Defunct newspapers published in New York City
Jewish newspapers published in the United States
Judaeo-Spanish-language newspapers published in the United States
Non-English-language newspapers published in New York (state)
Publications disestablished in 1925
Newspapers established in 1910
Sephardi Jewish culture in New York City
Spanish-American culture in New York City
Zionism in the United States